Spellbinder is an album by Hungarian guitarist Gábor Szabó featuring performances recorded in 1966 for the Impulse! label. The album contains "Gypsy Queen" which was covered as a medley with Fleetwood Mac's "Black Magic Woman" by Santana on their 1970 Abraxas album. This album reached #140 on 1967/01/28 on Billboard 200.

Reception
The Allmusic review by Thom Jurek awarded the album 4½ stars stating "Szabo's read on jazz in the '60s was brilliant. He embodied all of its most popular aspirations with a genuine spirit of innovation and adventure. Spellbinder is a masterpiece".

Track listing
All compositions by Gábor Szabó except as indicated
 "Spellbinder" - 5:30
 "Witchcraft" (Cy Coleman, Carolyn Leigh) - 4:39
 "It Was a Very Good Year" (Ervin Drake) - 2:47
 "Gypsy Queen" - 5:13
 "Bang Bang (My Baby Shot Me Down)" (Sonny Bono) - 2:28
 "Cheetah" - 4:10
 "My Foolish Heart" (Ned Washington, Victor Young) - 5:28
 "Yearning" - 2:59
 "Autumn Leaves/Speak to Me of Love" (Joseph Kosma, Jacques Prévert, Johnny Mercer/Jean Lenoir) - 3:35

Personnel
Gábor Szabó - guitar, vocals
Ron Carter - bass
Chico Hamilton – drums
Willie Bobo, Victor Pantoja - percussion

Charts
Album – Billboard

References

Impulse! Records albums
Gábor Szabó albums
1966 albums
Albums recorded at Van Gelder Studio
Albums produced by Bob Thiele